Mayer Hillman (born 1931) is a British architect, environmentalist and town planner. He is a Senior Fellow Emeritus since 1992 at the Policy Studies Institute, University of Westminster where he worked for at least thirty years.

Biography

Hillman was born in northwest London in 1931, the third son of David Hillman, a portrait painter and stained glass artist, and Dr Annie Hillman, a general practice physician (GP).

He and his brothers were raised in West Hampstead, by their Scottish Jewish parents, and in Rickmansworth during the WWII bombing raids.  He studied at the Bartlett School of Architecture, University College London and practiced as an architect for several years, before seeking a change in direction. He completed a PhD on transport, planning and environmental issues in 1970 at the University of Edinburgh, without a scholarship and supporting a young family with his wife Heidi Krott.

Established at the PSI, a policy thinktank, Hillman became an eclectic contributor to debates on transport, the environment and health. Several of his contrarian arguments and studies have been proven accurate with the passage of time. For example, he co-authored a 1990 study, One False Move, which equated the reduction in child casualties on British roads in recent decades with the loss of freedom that they have experienced because of the increase in traffic, with repercussions for child health. Several of his innovations, like raised-level intersections to slow traffic, have later been adopted in policy and planning.

Environmentalism

Hillman believes that public policy should be more socially and environmentally conscious, and is an animated speaker on a variety of topics, in his later years completing two books and promoting action on climate change. A strong proponent of personal carbon trading, he specifically helped develop the concept of personal carbon allowances.

Hillman is a lifelong cyclist, arguing against compulsory helmet laws in 1992, and in favour of cycling's health promotion possibilities in a British Medical Association report in 1992. Hillman has not flown for more than 20 years as part of his commitment to reducing carbon emissions. He has argued that governments have failed to implement the policies required to achieve global zero carbon emissions and it is "now too late", but he still recommends individuals to become vegan or vegetarian, not own a car, stop flying and limit the size of their family.

In 2018, he became scornful of individual action which he described "as good as futile", rhetorically asking "can you see everyone in a democracy volunteering to give up flying? Can you see the majority of the population becoming vegan? Can you see the majority agreeing to restrict the size of their families?" He believes that, "Even if the world went zero-carbon today that would not save us because we've gone past the point of no return." He announced his withdrawal from speaking and writing on climate change and other topics in 2018, with these statements.

Personal life

He married Heidi Krott in 1964, and they have two sons, born in 1968 and 1970. Hillman is a lifelong vegetarian.

Selected publications

 Hillman, M, T. Fawcett and S.C. Rajan. 2007.  The Suicidal Planet: How to Prevent Global Climate Catastrophe. St. Martin’s Press.
 Hillman, M. and T. Fawcett. 2004. How We Can Save the Planet, Penguin.  
 Hillman M., J. Adams and J. Whitelegg. 1990. One False Move. Policy Studies Institute, 
 Hillman, M. 1993. Cycle helmets: the case for and against. Policy Studies Institute.
 Ekins P, M. Hillman and R. Hutchison. 1992. The Gaia Atlas of Green Economics. Anchor Books.
 Hillman, M. 1992. Cycling: Towards Health and Safety. BMA, Oxford University Press.

A festschrift volume was published on his 70th birthday in 2001. Hutchison R. (ed.). 2001. Ahead of Time: Birthday Letters to Mayer Hillman. London: PSI. Authors look backward from his 90th birthday in 2021, testing his earlier predictions and innovations.

References

External links
 Mayer Hillman's website
 Policy Studies Institute page
 A chain reaction, interview in The Guardian ( November 2002 )

1931 births
Living people
Academics of the University of Westminster
Alumni of the University of Edinburgh
Alumni of University College London
Architects from London
British environmentalists
British Jews
British male writers
British non-fiction writers
Cycling advocates
Male non-fiction writers
Non-fiction environmental writers